Melecta luctuosa, also known as square-spotted mourning bee, is a species of bee within the family Apidae.

Description 
Melecta luctuosa measure 12–14 mm. The males and females have black hair with white patches of hair. The mesonotum and sides of the thorax are hairy gray.

Range 
Melecta luctuosa occurs in North Africa from the Canaries to Egypt. In Eurasia from Portugal across Europe, Asia Minor, Caucasus, Central Asia and Siberia to the Amur; north to southern England and southern Sweden (lost in both countries), the Baltic States and Moscow; south to Sicily, Crete, Cyprus and Northern Iran. It reached the oriental fauna region in Pakistan. The species is currently reported in central Europe from almost all regions, only from Lower Saxony, Saxony-Anhalt, Canton Vaud and Basel only historically; absent in large parts of the eastern central plateau, along the main Alpine ridge and in the Engadine; a report for the federal state of Salzburg needs to be checked.

Habitat 
Forest fringes, hedges, steep walls, edges, dry stone walls, sand, gravel and clay pits. From the lowlands to the montane elevation.

Ecology 
This species is univoltin. It is on the wing from late April to late June and is wintering as an imago. Various plant species serve as (exchangeable) nectar sources, e.g. Ajuga reptans, Glechoma hederacea, Salvia pratensis, Salvia verticillata, Nepeta, Echium vulgare, Anchusa officinalis. Melecta luctuosa is a parasitoid species. The main host is Anthophora aestivalis, other known hosts are Anthophora crinipes, Anthophora plagiata and Anthophora retusa, possibly also Anthophora fulvitarsis.

Etymology 
From Latin, luctuosa = "sad".

Taxonomy 
It belongs to the subgenus Melecta Latreille, 1802.

References 

Apinae
Hymenoptera of Africa
Hymenoptera of Asia
Hymenoptera of Europe
Taxa named by Giovanni Antonio Scopoli
Insects described in 1770